This is a list of the bishops of Strängnäs, part of the Church of Sweden that has its seat in Strängnäs Cathedral in Strängnäs, south of Lake Mälaren, Sweden).

Bishops before the Reformation 
 Gerdar 1129–1159
 Vilhelmus 1171–1190
 Uffe 1208–1210
 Olov Basatömer 1219–1224
 Throgillius 1233–1241
 Col 1253–1257
 Finvid 1267–1275
 Anund Jonsson 1275–1291
 Isarus 1292–1307
 Styrbjörn 1308–1343
 Frenderus 1343–1345
 Sigmundus 1345–1355
 Thyrgillus Johannis 1355–1378
 Tord Gunnarsson 1378–1401
 Petrus Johannis 1401–1408
 Gjord Petersson Rumpa 1409–1410
 Andreas Johannis 1410–1419
 Arnoldus Johannis 1420–1443
 Thomas Simonsson 1429–1443
 Ericus Birgeri 1443–1449
 Siggo Ulphonis 1449–1463
 Johannes Magni 1463–1479
 Kort Rogge 1479–1501
 Mattias Gregersson (Lillie) 1501–1520
 Jens Andersen Beldenak 1520–1521
 Magnus Sommar 1522–1536

Lutheran bishops after the Reformation
 Botvid Sunesson 1536–1555
 Ericus Nicolai Swart 1557–1561
 Botvid Sunesson 1561–1562
 Nicolaus Olaui 1563–1585
 Petrus Jonae 1586–1607
 Petrus Kenicius 1608–1609
 Laurentius Paulinus Gothus 1609–1637
 Laurentius Olai Wallius 1637–1638
 Jacobus Johannis Zebrozynthius 1639–1642
 Johannes Matthiae 1643–1664
 Erik Gabrielsson Emporagrius 1664–1674
 Carolus Lithman 1674–1686
 Erik Benzelius the Elder 1687–1700
 Johannes Bilberg 1701–1717
 Daniel Norlindh 1717–1728
 Daniel Lundius 1731–1747
 Erik Alstrin 1749–1762
 Jacob Serenius 1763–1776
 Carl Jesper Benzelius 1776–1793
 Stefan Insulin 1793–1803
 Johan Adam Tingstadius 1803–1827
 Per Thyselius 1829–1838
 Hans Olov Holmström 1839–1852
 Thure Annerstedt 1852–1880
 Adam Teodor Strömberg 1881–1889
 Uddo Lechard Ullman 1889–1927
 Sam Stadener 1927–1933
 Gustaf Aulén 1933–1952
 Dick Helander 1952–1954
 Gösta Lundström 1955–1972
 Åke Kastlund 1972–1982
 Tord Simonsson 1982–1989
 Jonas Jonson 1989–2005
 Hans-Erik Nordin 2005–2015
 Johan Dalman 2015–today

References
[s.n.] (2001) Strängnäs stift genom sekler - en stiftshistorisk översikt. Eskilstuna: Strängnäs stiftshistoriska sällskap. .

Lists of bishops and archbishops in Europe
 
Bishops of Strang